Nick Besler (born May 7, 1993) is an American professional soccer player.

Career

College
Besler spent his entire college career at the University of Notre Dame.  He made a total of 72 appearances for the Fighting Irish and tallied two goals and five assists.  He also helped the Fighting Irish win the 2013 College Cup.

Professional
On January 15, 2015, Besler was selected 5th overall in the 2015 MLS SuperDraft by the Portland Timbers.

On March 29, he made his professional debut for USL affiliate club Portland Timbers 2 in a 3–1 victory over Real Monarchs SLC.

Besler signed with United Soccer League side Real Monarchs on January 2, 2017. He scored his first goal for Real Monarchs on March 28, 2017 in a 2–1 victory against his former club Portland Timbers 2. Besler was the captain for the club.

On August 24, 2017, Besler was signed to the Monarchs' Major League Soccer parent club Real Salt Lake.

Following the 2022 season, his contract option was declined by Salt Lake.

Personal life
He is the younger brother of Matt Besler, a retired soccer player who played for Sporting Kansas City and Austin FC.

Honors
Portland Timbers
MLS Cup: 2015
Western Conference (playoffs): 2015

References

External links

Notre Dame Fighting Irish bio

1993 births
Living people
American soccer players
Association football midfielders
Major League Soccer players
MLS Next Pro players
Notre Dame Fighting Irish men's soccer players
Sportspeople from Overland Park, Kansas
Portland Timbers draft picks
Portland Timbers players
Portland Timbers 2 players
Real Monarchs players
Real Salt Lake players
Soccer players from Kansas
USL Championship players